The 1962–63 Hamburger SV season was the 16th and final season playing in the Oberliga Nord, the first-tier of football in the region, before the formation of the national Bundesliga in 1963. Hamburg also competed in this season's editions of the German football championship and the DFB-Pokal.

On 14 August 1963, HSV won the DFB-Pokal for the first time in club history, defeating Borussia Dortmund in the final, at the Niedersachsenstadion in Hanover, by a score of 3–0 courtesy of an Uwe Seeler hat-trick.

Competitions

Overall record

Oberliga Nord

League table

German football championship

Results

DFB-Pokal

Results

References

Hamburger SV seasons